Marko Mikael "Adder" Palo (born 26 September 1967 in Jyväskylä, Finland) is a retired professional ice hockey player who played in the SM-liiga.  He played for Ässät, Espoo Blues, and HPK, and won the 1995 Swedish championship with HV 71. He was inducted into the Finnish Hockey Hall of Fame in 2005. Palo is also known as adder, because of his striped ice hockey socks.

During the 1994–1995 season he made up a fearsome duo together with Esa Keskinen for HV71.

Career statistics

Regular season and playoffs

International

References

External links
 Maroo Palo at Eliteprospects 
 Finnish Hockey Hall of Fame bio }

1967 births
Living people
Ässät players
Espoo Blues players
HPK players
Ice hockey players at the 1994 Winter Olympics
Ice hockey players with retired numbers
Medalists at the 1994 Winter Olympics
Olympic bronze medalists for Finland
Olympic ice hockey players of Finland
Olympic medalists in ice hockey
Sportspeople from Jyväskylä
20th-century Finnish people